The Singles Album compiles all of the singles released by the Jimi Hendrix Experience and Jimi Hendrix up to the 1979 release of "Gloria". It was issued only in Europe in February 1983 as a two-LP set, and on cassette. It was released as a two-CD set in 1985, digitally engineered in London by Carlos Olms.

Track listing 
All songs are by Jimi Hendrix, except where noted.

Disc One 
"Hey Joe" (William Roberts) -3:25
"Stone Free" - 3:34
"Purple Haze" - 2:45
"51st Anniversary" - 3:14 (Mono)
"The Wind Cries Mary" - 3:16
"Highway Chile" - 3:28 (Mono)
"The Burning of the Midnight Lamp" - 3:36
"The Stars That Play with Laughing Sam's Dice" - 4:17 (Mono)
"All Along the Watchtower" (Bob Dylan) - 3:58
"Long Hot Summer Night" - 3:25
"Cross Town Traffic" - 2:18
"Let Me Light Your Fire" - 2:38

Disc Two 
"Voodoo Child (Slight Return)" - 5:12
"Angel" - 4:15
"Night Bird Flying" - 3:51
"Gypsy Eyes" - 3:41
"Remember" - 2:44 (Mono enhanced for stereo)
"Johnny B. Goode" (Live) (Chuck Berry) - 4:03
"Little Wing" (Live) - 3:15
"Foxy Lady" - 3:10
"Manic Depression" - 3:35
"3rd Stone From The Sun" - 6:38
"Gloria" (Van Morrison) - 8:45

References
CD Pamphlet from The Singles Album, 1983

Albums produced by Eddie Kramer
Albums produced by Chas Chandler
Compilation albums published posthumously
Jimi Hendrix compilation albums
1983 compilation albums
Polydor Records compilation albums